Paramount Consumer Products (formerly Nickelodeon & Viacom Consumer Products, then ViacomCBS Consumer Products) is the retailing and licensing division of Paramount Global. The department is in charge of merchandising for Paramount-owned brands. As of 2015, the division was valued at $3 billion.

While the company manages merchandise for the entire Paramount portfolio (including Paramount Pictures and Comedy Central), its main focus is Paramount's children's television brand, Nickelodeon. Most of its products are based on TV shows that originated on the network, as well as properties that they purchased and incorporated into Nickelodeon, like Teenage Mutant Ninja Turtles and Winx Club. From 2007 onward, the division's most profitable property has been SpongeBob SquarePants.

According to an article in The Chicago Tribune, Paramount Consumer Products takes "an unconventional approach to licensing" where the company waits up to two years after a show's premiere before releasing tie-in merchandise. This is in contrast to competitors like Disney Consumer Products, which generally release products to coincide with a premiere.

History

1990s and 2000s
Nickelodeon & Viacom Consumer Products (NVCP) was founded in 1991. At first, it was a subdivision of Nickelodeon Enterprises, a business unit set up to license Nickelodeon's properties to other companies.

One of the division's first profitable franchises was Rugrats, which the News & Record called Nickelodeon's "first big splash in consumer products." Merchandise sales for Rugrats peaked at over $1 billion in 1999. The following year, NVCP released merchandise spun off from Blue's Clues, which also garnered over a billion dollars in revenue.

SpongeBob SquarePants represented the "company's biggest surprise" when tie-in products were first released in the early 2000s. Revenues from SpongeBob items exceeded Nickelodeon's expectations by over $250 million. At first, merchandising companies were hesitant to produce merchandise based on the show, and they "underestimated consumers' emotional connection" with it. By 2003, however, there were over 100 companies that were licensed to use the SpongeBob brand.

Shows like SpongeBob helped Nickelodeon Enterprises (the branch of Nickelodeon that included NVCP) become Viacom's fastest-growing asset in the early 2000s. In 2003, Nickelodeon's consumer products arm generated $2.5 billion in sales, which marked a 19 percent increase from the year before. Meanwhile, the sales of the company's main competitors (Disney and Warner Bros.) were both flat compared to the previous year.

In late 2003, the division experimented with creating a pair of new properties that were not based on TV characters. These "off-channel" brands were the video game franchise Tak and the Power of Juju and everGirl, a doll line and website designed to promote a positive self-image for girls. everGirl was co-created by Angela Santomero (one of the creators of Blue's Clues) and its development was overseen by Leigh Anne Brodsky, who went onto become the president of NVCP from 2004 to late 2011.

Nickelodeon & Viacom Consumer Products took over Paramount Pictures' licensing activities in 2004, relocating all operations to New York. Paramount, which is Viacom's film division, had previously managed licensing from its own Hollywood offices. Three years later, Paramount regained its own licensing division in Hollywood with the foundation of a separate department called Paramount Licensing.

In 2007, NVCP named Jakks Pacific as the master licensee for SpongeBob SquarePants, continuing a long partnership between the two companies.

2010s

Nickelodeon & Viacom Consumer Products appointed Michael Connolly, a former Disney Consumer Products executive, as head of international consumer products in 2010. In the following years, Connolly helped relaunch two brands that Viacom had purchased: Teenage Mutant Ninja Turtles and Winx Club. Connolly said that TMNT represented an opportunity to appeal to collectors and the "comic book geek crowd" while Winx Club provided Nickelodeon "with a much-needed girl's property." One of Nickelodeon's top priorities for 2012 was to reboot both franchises worldwide; Kidscreen reported that the company had "international plans to make a splash at retail with the rebooted Teenage Mutant Ninja Turtles and Winx IPs."

In 2012, Connolly suggested that Viacom's consumer products had been decreasingly relevant to the public for several years, and that he hoped the introduction of the toyetic brands TMNT and Winx Club would change this. Connolly also stated that SpongeBob toys did not sell as well as other non-toy products based on the franchise:

From 2013 to 2015, Nickelodeon & Viacom Consumer Products started to open Nickelodeon-branded stores worldwide, including a flagship location in Leicester Square, London. Around 80 percent of the stores' merchandise was exclusive; Nickelodeon opened an online e-commerce site at NickelodeonStore.co.uk so that international fans could buy it. By 2016, NVCP had opened twelve different Nickelodeon stores.

Following the 2019 merger of CBS and Viacom, Nickelodeon & Viacom Consumer Products (NVCP) was renamed ViacomCBS Consumer Products (VCP), and it began to manage merchandise for CBS-owned properties from CBS Television Studios and Showtime. As a result, CBS Consumer Products was integrated into VCP.

Notes

References

External links
Nickelodeon Store website (archive)

Consumer Products
Companies based in New York City
1991 establishments in New York City
Mass media companies established in 1991